This is a list of people who have served as Lord Lieutenant for Clwyd. The office was created on 1 April 1974.

Brigadier Hugh Salusbury Kynaston Mainwaring, C.B., C.B.E., D.S.O., T.D. 1 April 1974 – 23 November 1976 (formerly Lord Lieutenant of Flintshire), with a lieutenant:
Sir Owen Watkin Williams-Wynn, 10th Baronet 1 April 1974 – 23 November 1976 (formerly Lord Lieutenant of Denbighshire)
Sir Owen Watkin Williams-Wynn, 10th Baronet 23 November 1976 – 1979
Col. James Ellis Evans 28 December 1979 – August 1985
Sir William Gladstone, 7th Baronet August 1985 – 5 June 2001
Trefor Jones 5 June 2001 – 2012
Henry George Fetherstonhaugh 2013 – present

References

1974 establishments in Wales
Clwyd
Clwyd